Xianzi is a common posthumous name of Eastern Zhou feudal lords. It may refer to:
Fan Xianzi
Han Xianzi
Wei Xianzi
Zhao Xianzi
Zhonghang Xianzi

Other uses
Xianzi (monk)
Zhang Xianzi, Chinese singer
Xianzi (activist), Zhou Xiaoxuan, participant in China's #MeToo movement
Xianzi (musical instrument)